The 1996 Cork Intermediate Football Championship was the 61st staging of the Cork Intermediate Football Championship since its establishment by the Cork County Board in 1909. The draw for the opening round fixtures took place on 10 December 1995. 

The final was played on 8 September 1996 at Páirc Uí Chaoimh in Cork, between Clyda Rovers and Carrigaline, in what was their first ever meeting in a final. Clyda Rovers won the match by 0-16 to 1-05 to claim their first ever championship title.

Results

Final

References

Cork Intermediate Football Championship